The Anthologist is a novel about poetry by Nicholson Baker, which was first published in 2009.

Its protagonist is Paul Chowder, a poet with a commission to prepare and edit an anthology of poetry, Only Rhyme. The novel shows his life, his thoughts, aspirations and struggles with writer's block.

Reception
Michael Schmidt, reviewing the book for The Independent, gave it a mixed reception,

David Orr, reviewing for The New York Times, liked the novel's portrayal of, and engagement with, the world of poets and poetry,

Poets and works discussed

References

External links
 Simon & Schuster

2009 American novels

Novels by Nicholson Baker
Novels about writers
Metafictional novels